The 2017–18 Basketball Bundesliga, known as the easyCredit BBL for sponsorship reasons, was the 52nd season of the Basketball Bundesliga (BBL), the top-tier level of professional club basketball in Germany. The defending champion was Brose Bamberg. The regular season started on 29 September 2017 and ended 1 May 2018.

Bayern Munich won their fourth title and qualified for the 2018–19 EuroLeague.

Notable occurrences
For the first time in BBL history, two windows for FIBA national team play were planned in which the competition stopped. These were in November 2017 and February 2018.
A number of nine teams participated in European club competitions this season, the highest number ever in German basketball history.

Teams

Promotion and relegation
Relegated from BBL
Rasta Vechta and Phoenix Hagen were relegated from the BBL after the 2016–17 season, as they finished in the last two places.

Promoted from ProA
Mitteldeutscher BC and Rockets got promoted from the 2016–17 ProA.

Arenas and locations

Regular season
In the regular season, teams played against each other two times home-and-away in a round-robin format. The first eight teams advanced to the playoffs. The last two placed teams were relegated to the ProA for next season. The regular season started on 29 September 2017 and concluded 1 May 2018.

Standings

Results

Playoffs

All three rounds of the playoffs are played in a best-of-five format, with the higher seeded team playing the first, third and fifth game at home.

Awards and statistics

Major award winners

Statistical leaders

All-Star Game
The 2018 BBL All-Star Game was played in the Lokhalle in Göttingen on 13 January 2018. Team International won the game 145–132 over Team National. Peyton Siva was named Most Valuable Player of the game.

 Injured player.
REP Player selected as replacement.

Clubs in European competitions

See also
2018 BBL-Pokal

References

External links
Official website 

Basketball Bundesliga seasons
German
1